Vaidava River is a river in Estonia-Latvia border. The river is 72 km long (of which 61 km is in Latvia). The river starts from Murati Lake and flows into Mustjõgi.

References

Rivers of Estonia
Rivers of Latvia